Galatasaray SK. Men's 1931–1932 season is the 1931–1932 volleyball season for Turkish professional basketball club Galatasaray Yurtiçi Kargo.

The club competes in:
Istanbul Men's Volleyball League

Team Roster Season 1931-1932

Results, schedules and standings

Istanbul Volleyball League 1931–32

Results

Regular season

References

Galatasaray S.K. (men's volleyball) seasons
Galatasaray Sports Club 1931–32 season